Peter Öberg (Swedish) or Oberg (German) may refer to:

Peter Öberg (ice hockey) (born 1982), Swedish professional ice hockey player
Peter Öberg (orienteer) (born 1980), Swedish orienteering competitor